Marcelino Vargas (born 1921, date of death unknown) was a Paraguayan football goalkeeper who played for Paraguay in the 1950 FIFA World Cup. He also played for Club Libertad. Vargas is deceased.

References

External links
FIFA profile

1921 births
Year of death missing
Paraguayan footballers
Paraguay international footballers
Association football goalkeepers
Club Libertad footballers
1950 FIFA World Cup players